Andreyevka is a rural locality (a village) in Klyazminskoye Rural Settlement, Kovrovsky District, Vladimir Oblast, Russia. The population was 17 as of 2010.

Geography 
Andreyevka is located 16 km east of Kovrov (the district's administrative centre) by road. Dostizheniye is the nearest rural locality.

References 

Rural localities in Kovrovsky District